Diaphoreolis lagunae, common name orange-face cuthona, is a species of sea slug, an aeolid nudibranch, a marine gastropod mollusc in the family Trinchesiidae.

Distribution
This species has been recorded along the Eastern Pacific coastline of North America from Curry County, Oregon, United States to Bahía Tortugas, Mulegé Municipality, Baja California, Mexico.

Ecology
Diaphoreolis lagunae feeds on the hydroid Sertularella turgida, family Sertulariidae.

References

Trinchesiidae
Gastropods described in 1926